Kinabatangan is a language of Sabah, Malaysia.

References

Paitanic languages
Languages of Malaysia